Hair is a collaborative album between California musicians Ty Segall and Tim Presley (playing under the name White Fence). The album was released through Drag City Records for Record Store Day 2012, for a limited run but has however, been repressed. The album was originally intended to be a split album between Segall and Presley, however they then decided to collaborate on all of the tracks. Presley had already previously recorded the track "I Am Not A Game," however re-recorded it for the album.

Track listing

References

2012 albums
Ty Segall albums
Tim Presley albums